The Bisher Formation is a geologic formation in Ohio. It preserves fossils dating back to the Silurian period.

See also

 List of fossiliferous stratigraphic units in Ohio

References

 

Silurian Ohio
Silurian southern paleotemperate deposits
Sheinwoodian